Arhopala allata is a butterfly of the family Lycaenidae. It is found in Asia (see subspecies section).

Subspecies
 A. a. allata (Staudinger, 1889) (Palawan, Mindanao)
 A. a. atarana (Tytler, 1926) (Burma, Shan States, Ataran)
 A. a. suffusa (Tytler, 1915) - previously Amblypodia suffusa, commonly known as Tytler's rosy oakblue (Manipur)
 A. a. pandora Corbet, 1941 (Peninsular Malaya, Sumatra)
 A. a. evandra Corbet (Borneo)
 A. a. pambihira (Takanami, 1982) (Philippines)

Arhopala
Butterflies of Borneo
Butterflies of Asia
Taxa named by Otto Staudinger
Butterflies described in 1889